Waman Dattatreya Patwardhan (30 January 1917 – 27 July 2007) was an IOFS officer, nuclear chemist, defence scientist and an expert in the science of Explosives engineering. He was the founder director of the Explosives Research and Development Laboratory (now known as the High Energy Materials Research Laboratory (HEMRL)) of India. He is considered one of the distinguished scientists in India due to his contributions to Indian space program, Indian nuclear program and missile program in their early stages. He developed the solid propellant for India's first space rocket launched at Thumba. He was responsible for developing the detonation system of India's first nuclear device which was successfully tested in 1974, an operation codenamed Smiling Buddha.

Other areas of work: Wrote a book on Hydroponics and developed a cost-effective method for producing parabolic mirrors for astronomical telescopes.

He was awarded Padma Shri in 1974 by the Government of India for his contributions.

References

External links
Waman Dattatreya Patwardhan

Indian Ordnance Factories Service officers
Scientists from Madhya Pradesh
20th-century Indian chemists
1917 births
2007 deaths
People from Jabalpur
Indian military engineers
20th-century Indian engineers
Recipients of the Padma Shri in trade and industry